The Morning of the Magicians: Introduction to Fantastic Realism is a 1960 book by the journalists Louis Pauwels and Jacques Bergier. As the authors disclaim in their preface, the book is intended to challenge readers' viewpoints on historic events, whether they believe the explanations or not, but with the goal to give readers the opportunity to test their level of cognitive dissonance and critical thinking skills. The book is often referenced by conspiracy-theory enthusiasts and presents a collection of "raw material for speculation of the most outlandish order" by covering topics like cryptohistory, ufology, occultism in Nazism, alchemy, spiritual philosophy and Die Glocke. Written in French, Le Matin des magiciens was translated into English by Rollo Myers in 1963 under the title The Dawn of Magic, and in 1964 released in the United States as The Morning of the Magicians (Stein and Day; paperback in 1968 by Avon Books). A German edition was published 1962 with the title Aufbruch ins dritte Jahrtausend (Departure into the Third Millennium).

The Morning of the Magicians became a cult classic within the youth culture in France in the 1960s and the 1970s. Cautioned by the hostile reception by skeptic reviewers (notable among whom were the secular humanists Yves Galifret, Évry Schatzman and Jean-Claude Pecker from the Rationalist Union, who debunked the book in Le crépuscule des Magiciens (1965); "The Twilight of the Magicians"),
Pauwels and Bergier went on to pursue their interest in the paranormal in the magazine Planète, dedicated to what they termed réalisme fantastique (fantastic realism). Both The Morning of the Magicians and the Planète magazine had considerable influence on the esotericism of the 1960s–1970s counterculture, heralding the popularization of New Age ideas.

Background
Pauwels and Bergier worked on the book over five years, compiling voluminous documentation incorporated into the Bibliothèque nationale de France as Fonds Pauwels in 2007. Heavily influenced by Charles Fort's work and ideas, the authors' primary aim was to arouse the curiosity of their readership, stating "Let us repeat that there will be a lot of silliness in our book, but this matters little if the book stirs up a few vocations and, to a certain degree, prepares broader tracks for research".

Influence
In a 2004 article for Skeptic, the author Jason Colavito wrote that the book's tales of ancient astronauts predated Erich von Däniken's works on the topic, and that the ideas are so close to the fictional works of H. P. Lovecraft such as "The Call of Cthulhu" or At the Mountains of Madness (published in 1928 and 1931, respectively) that, according to Colavito, it is probable that Lovecraft's fiction directly inspired the book.

The fifth track on The Flaming Lips album Yoshimi Battles the Pink Robots is titled "In the Morning of the Magicians", referencing the novel.

References

External links
Collection of cover art from various editions

1960 non-fiction books
Books about conspiracy theories
Éditions Gallimard books
Forteana
French non-fiction books
Occult books
Works by Louis Pauwels
Occultism in Nazism
Nazi exploitation